Sean O'Brien (born 19 December 1952 in London) is a British poet, critic and playwright. His prizes include the Eric Gregory Award (1979), the Somerset Maugham Award (1984), the Cholmondeley Award (1988), the Forward Poetry Prize (1995, 2001 and 2007) and the T. S. Eliot Prize (2007). He is one of only three poets (the others being Ted Hughes and John Burnside) to have won both the T. S. Eliot Prize and the Forward Poetry Prize for the same collection of poems (The Drowned Book). He grew up in Hull, and was educated at Hymers College and Selwyn College, Cambridge. He has lived in Newcastle upon Tyne since 1990, where he teaches at the university. He was the Weidenfeld Visiting Professor at St. Anne's College, Oxford for 2016-17.

Career
O Brien's book of essays on contemporary poetry, The Deregulated Muse (Bloodaxe), was published in 1998, as was his anthology The Firebox: Poetry in Britain and Ireland after 1945 (Picador). Cousin Coat: Selected Poems 1976–2001 (Picador) was published in 2002. Sean O'Brien's new verse version of Dante's Inferno was published by Picador in October 2006. His six collections of poetry to date have all won awards. In 2007 he won the Northern Rock Foundation Writer's Award, Forward Prize for Best Collection and the T S Eliot Prize for The Drowned Book (Picador, 2007).  This was the first time a poet had been awarded the Forward and the Eliot prizes in the same year. In 2006, he was appointed Professor of Creative Writing at Newcastle University, and was previously Professor of Poetry at Sheffield Hallam University. He is a Vice-President of the Poetry Society. He was co-founder of the literary magazine The Printer's Devil and contributes reviews to newspapers and magazines including The Sunday Times and The Times Literary Supplement and is a regular broadcaster on radio. His writing for television includes "Cousin Coat", a poem-film in Wordworks (Tyne Tees Television, 1991); "Cantona", a poem-film in On the Line (BBC2, 1994); Strong Language, a 45-minute poem-film (Channel 4, 1997) and The Poet Who Left the Page, a profile of Simon Armitage (BBC4, 2002). Other significant work includes a radio adaptation for BBC Radio 4 of "We" by Yevgeny Zamyatin.

Awards and honours
1979 – Eric Gregory Award
1984 – Somerset Maugham Award – The Indoor Park
1988 – Cholmondeley Award
1992 Northern Arts Literary Fellowship
1993 – E. M. Forster Award
1995 – Forward Poetry Prize (Best Poetry Collection of the Year) – Ghost Train
2001 – Forward Poetry Prize (Best Poetry Collection of the Year) – Downriver
2001 – Northern Writer of the Year Award
2001 – T. S. Eliot Prize (shortlist) – Downriver
2006 – Forward Poetry Prize (Best Single Poem for Fantasia on a Theme of James Wright)
2007 – Northern Rock Foundation Writer's Award
2007 – Forward Poetry Prize (Best Collection) – The Drowned Book
2007 – T. S. Eliot Prize – The Drowned Book
2007 – Royal Society of Literature fellowship
2012 – Griffin Poetry Prize International shortlist – November

Bibliography

Poetry 
Collections
 
 1987: The Frighteners (Bloodaxe)
 1989: Boundary Beach  (Ulsterman Publications)
 1991: HMS Glasshouse (Oxford University Press)
 1993: A Rarity (Carnivorous Arpeggio)
 1995: Ghost Train (Oxford University Press)
 1995: Penguin Modern Poets 5 (with Simon Armitage and Tony Harrison) (Penguin)
 1997: The Ideology (Smith/Doorstep)
 2001: Downriver (Picador)
 2002: Cousin Coat: Selected Poems 1976–2001   (Picador)
 2002: Rivers (with John Kinsella and Peter Porter) (Fremantle Arts Centre Press, Australia)
 2006: Inferno: a verse version of Dante's Inferno (Picador)
 2007: The Drowned Book (Picador)
 2009: Night Train (with artist Birtley Aris) (Flambard Press)
 2011: November (Picador)
 2015: The Beautiful Librarians (Picador)
 2018: Europa (Picador)
2019: Contributor to A New Divan, A Lyrical Dialogue between East and West, Gingko Library, 
2020: It Says Here (Picador)
2022: Embark (Picador)

Anthologies (edited)
 1998: The Firebox: Poetry in Britain and Ireland after 1945 (editor) (Picador)
 2008: Andrew Marvell: poems selected by Sean O'Brien (Poet to Poet series, Faber and Faber)

List of poems

Plays
2000: Laughter When We're Dead
2001: My Last Barmaid
2001: Downriver, cowritten with Keith Morris
2002: The Birds: a new verse version of Aristophanes' Birds (Methuen)
2003: Keepers of the Flame (Methuen)
2003: Live Theatre: Six Plays from the North East (with Cecil Taylor, Tom Hadaway, Alan Plater, Lee Hall, Julia Darling) (Methuen)

Novels
 2008: Afterlife (Picador)

Short fiction 
Collections
 2005: Ellipsis 1: Short Stories by Sean O'Brien, Jean Sprackland and Tim Cooke (Comma Press)
 2005: Phantoms at the Phil (with Chaz Brenchley and Gail-Nina Anderson) (Side Real/Northern Gothic)
 2006: Phantoms at the Phil- The Second Proceedings (with Chaz Brenchley and Gail-Nina Anderson) (Side Real/Northern Gothic)
 2007: Phantoms at the Phil- The Third Proceedings (with Chaz Brenchley and Gail-Nina Anderson) (Side Real/Northern Gothic)
 2008: The Silence Room (Comma Press)

Literary criticism
 1998: The Deregulated Muse: Essays on Contemporary British and Irish Poetry (Bloodaxe)

Notes

Sources
The Oxford Companion to Twentieth-Century Poetry ed. Ian Hamilton (OUP, 1996)
The Idea of North Peter Davidson (Reaktion Books, 2005)

External links

Profile at Poetry Archive

1952 births
Living people
Alumni of Selwyn College, Cambridge
English literary critics
English male non-fiction writers
English male poets
Fellows of the Royal Society of Literature
The New Yorker people
Writers from Kingston upon Hull
T. S. Eliot Prize winners
British republicans